Constantin Sterea (born January 2, 1951) is a Romanian former volleyball player who competed in the 1980 Summer Olympics.

He was born in Constanţa.

In 1980 he was part of the Romanian team which won the bronze medal in the Olympic tournament. He played five matches.

External links
profile

1951 births
Living people
Sportspeople from Constanța
Romanian men's volleyball players
Olympic volleyball players of Romania
Volleyball players at the 1980 Summer Olympics
Olympic bronze medalists for Romania
Olympic medalists in volleyball
Medalists at the 1980 Summer Olympics